Ljubomir Tito Stjepan Babić (14 June 1890 – 14 May 1974) was a Croatian artist, museum curator and literary critic. As an artist, he worked in a variety of media including oils, tempera, watercolour, drawing, etching, and lithography. He was one of the most influential figures in the Zagreb art scene between the two world wars.

He collaborated with director Branko Gavella in creating a series of set designs for the Croatian National Theatre in Zagreb. In 1940 he became a full professor at the Academy of Fine Arts Zagreb. He held exhibitions at home and abroad and published many articles on art history and critiques of contemporary art events. He wrote and illustrated many books, worked on designs for posters, interiors and decorative arts objects.

Biography
Ljubomir Tito Stjepan Babić was born in Jastrebarsko on 14 June 1890, the son of Judge Antun Babić and Milka (née Kovačić), and nephew of the author Ljubo Babić (better known as Ksaver Šandor Gjalski). The Babić family had been raised to the nobility in 1716 by Charles VI Habsburg. The Babić family seat was Gredice near Zabok, which had been purchased by Babić's grandfather.

Following his father's work transfers, young Ljubo attended elementary school in Slatina, Glina and Jastrebarsko. He attended high school in Bjelovar, with the final two years in the Donji Grad gymnasium in Zagreb. During that time, he attended private art school with Menci Clement Crnčić and Bela Čikoš Sesija, and took classes at the School of Arts and Crafts. After completing high school in 1908, at his father's encouragement he enrolled in the Faculty of Law at Zagreb University, but soon abandoned his studies for painting.

Thanks to a scholarship from Count Teodor Pejačević Babić was able to attend the Academy of Fine Arts, Munich where he studied painting with Angelo Jank (1910–11), and Franz von Stuck (1911–13). In Munich, he completed a course of artistic anatomy at the Medical School while also studying set design at the Künstlertheater. In 1913-14 he went on to complete his art studies in Paris, returning to his homeland at the beginning of the First World War.

He exhibited his artworks as a part of Kingdom of Serbia's pavilion at International Exhibition of Art of 1911.

There he opened a "modern painting school" in his studio, but soon afterwards accepted a teaching position at the School of Arts, (now the Academy of Fine Arts) where he became a full professor in 1940, working there for 45 years until he retired in 1961. During the 1930s, he visited other schools and institutes around Europe in order to learn from their experience and improve teaching at the Zagreb academy. In 1932, he graduated in art history from the Faculty of Philosophy, Zagreb University.

In addition to his painting and teaching careers, Ljubo Babić was the first curator of the Modern Gallery in Zagreb (1919) whose inaugural exhibition featured the previously unknown works of Josip Račić. He organized exhibitions of modern French and German Art in Zagreb, and an exhibition of medieval art from Yugoslavia in Paris in 1950. For many years he was the director of The Strossmayer Gallery of Old Masters (from 1947) responsible for organizing many important exhibitions.

Babić was one of the organizers of the Croatian Spring Salon (1916), the Independent group of Croatian artists (1923), the Group of Three (1929), Group of Four (1928), the group of Croatian artists (1936)  and Croatian artists (1939).

Ljubo Babić was elected as a Member of Croatian Academy of Sciences and Arts in 1928, becoming a full member in 1950. He died in Zagreb on 14 May 1974.

Legacy
Ljubo Babić was a central figure in the Croatian art scene in the period between the two world wars. His views provided a strong influence over the art of the time. His early work from Munich shows some poetic symbolism and art nouveau. In portraits, he soon began to depict the more psychological characteristics of his subject. From 1916, expressionistic ideas and themes appeared, and a move towards abstraction, resulting in some of his finest works. In November 1916, on the death of Emperor Francis Joseph, all the streets of Zagreb were dressed in black flags. Inspired by this image, Babić, then aged 26, painted the scene from the second floor window of his studio on Ilica Street. In the foreground is a long, torn black flag and behind it are ominous clouds, and below the people passing. Black Flag (crna zastava) stands as one of his most memorable images.

Writer Miroslav Krleža said of Babić - in the years between 1916 and 1922 - that he was strongly influenced by the time and by his own ideas. A strong influence on both was the poet Silvije Strahimir Kranjčević. Babić illustrated Kranjčević's "Songs" (Pjesme, 1908) and many of the poet's themes entered Babić's own work. From the inspiration of the mountain Velebit as seen from Crnčić, Babić created one of his most successful series: "View from the Sky" (Pogled s neba), "Aerial view" (Arielov pogled). He would later be known as the father of modern landscape painting in Croatia.

A journey to Spain in 1920 resulted in an expressive series of paintings, including the powerful black "Fishermen" (Ribere). This cycle of Spanish street scenes was well received and stands as a high point of Babić's own art and Croatian painting in general.

Around 1930, Babić started a series of landscapes and people from around Croatia. He would travel south in the summer months, sketching scenes from Koločep and Pelješca, to Čiovo and Trogir (1930–1936). He was working on what he called "native expression", believing that the landscape, historical experience and folk art could reveal the characteristics of the people. Back in his studio, he created an impressive cycle of landscapes (the series Homeland, Rodni kraj 1933-1939). This series brings his art close to documentary work and Babić worked closely with Matica hrvatska on aspects of folk heritage and modern cultural and artistic issues.

Babić was one of the creators of the golden years of Zagreb theatre life in the 1920s/30s. He made his debut as set designer in 1918, altogether creating about 180 designs (often also sketches for the costumes) for drama, comedy and operatic performances. His designs were always based on the logic of the stage events, and contributed greatly to the development of dramatic action. He was also the founder of the first artistic Puppet Theatre in Zagreb (1920), and his set designs for the Paris Expo in 1925, earned him the Grand Prix.

In addition to being a creative artist and designer, Babić was also an interpreter and popularizer of art: as an art writer and critic, as a lecturer, and as a museum curator. He was the most reliable interpreter of Croatian heritage in art museums and exhibitions between 1919-1948. He also created posters and some very successful books on art (1908–1960).

Babić's literary output includes 20 books, brochures and special editions, around 400 articles in periodicals, many encyclopedia articles and several educational programs. In addition to educational and critic works, he left a number of travel and autobiographical texts. Babić's travelogue text New York "skyline" was included  in an anthology America Spectrum from one hundred forty-one works of European writers and works (Spektrum America aus Werken hunderteinundvierzig europäischer Dichter und Werken), Wien-München-Manutius Press, 1964. He was a member of several editorial boards of literary magazines, and editor of the Academy bulletin 1957.

Works

Paintings

 From Munich Studio (Iz münchenskog atelijera), 1911
 Self-portrait (Autoportret), 1912
 Portrait of A.G. Matoš (Portret A. G. Matoša), 1913
 Black flag (Crna zastava), 1916
 Portrait of Miroslav Krleza (Portret M. Krleže), 1918
 Christ (Krist), around 1918
 Krajolik, 1918
 Red Flags (Crveni stjegovi) I. i II., 1919
 View from Brestovca (Pogled s Brestovca), 1919
 Crucifixion (Golgota), 1919
 Izgradnja, 1919
 Raspeće, 1920
 Spanish cycle (watercolours) (ciklus akvarela S puta po Španjolskoj), 1920
 Pogreb, 1926
 Croatian peasant (Hrvatski seljak), 1926
 Figs (Smokve), 1928
 Spring flowers (Proljetno cvijeće), 1930
 Figs at Vignja (Smokvice kod Vignja), 1930
 Landscape (Pejzaž), 1931
 The Road to Koločep (Put na Koločepu), 1932
 Nevenka, 1932
 S Mrežnice, 1932
 My Studio (Moj atelijer), 1933
 Portrait of my wife (Portret supruge), 1934
 Spring Countryside (Proljetni pejzaž), 1936
 Autumn on Ciovo (Jesen na Čiovu), 1936
 Self-portrait (Autoportret), 1937
 Zagorje Countryside (Zagorski pejzaž), 1937
 Homeland (Rodni kraj) (Pred večernjicu), 1938
 Janica, 1938
 Dried Flowers (Suho cvijeće), 1942
 Spring, house and me (Proljeće, kuća i ja), 1953
 From my Garden (Iz mog vrta), 1956
 Orebi, 1964

Theatrical Set Designs

 Verdi: Othelo, 1918
 Goethe: Faust, 1921
 Krleža: Golgota, 1922
 Širola-Babić: Sjene, 1923
 Debussy: Peleas i Melisanda, 1923
 Shakespeare: King Richard III, 1923
 Krleža: Vučjak, 1923
 Shakespeare: Na tri kralja…, 1924
 Wedekind: Proljeće se budi, 1924
 Shakespeare: Hamlet, 1929
 Beethoven: Fidelio, 1930
 Büchner: Dantonova smrt, 1937
 Cesarec: Sin domovine, 1940
 Pirandello: Večeras improviziramo, 1941
 Shakespeare: Hamlet (nova verzija, neostvareno), 1941

Book Illustrations

 Kumičić: Začuđeni svatovi, 1910
 Kučera-Plivelić-Božičević: Novovjeki izumi, 1910
 Nazor: Hrvatski kraljevi, 1912
 Dante: Čistilište, 1912
 Bazala: Povijest filozofije, 1912
 Vidrić: Pjesme, 1914
 Donadini: Lude priče, 1915
 Schneider: Oprema opere, 1916
 Nehajev: Studija o Hamletu, 1917
 Krleža: Pjesme I, Pjesme II, 1918
 Vijavica (časopis), 1919
 Juriš (časopis), 1919
 Plamen (časopis), 1919
 Begović: Dunja u kovčegu, 1921
 Cesarec: Careva kraljevina, 1925
 Shakespeare: Sabrana djela (nedovršeno), 1947–1960
 Ljetopis popa Dukljanina, 1950
 Ariosto: Bijesni Orlando, 1953
 A.G. Matoš: Sabrana djela (nedovršeno), 1953–1955
 Goethe: Faust, 1955

Books and publications

 Maestral, 1931
 Croatian Art in the 19th Century (Umjetnost kod Hrvata u XIX. stoljeću), Zagreb 1934
 Under Italian Skies (Pod italskim nebom), Zagreb 1937
 Croatian Art (Umjetnost kod Hrvata) (SD, I), Zagreb 1943
 Masters Revival (Majstori preporoda) (SD, II), Zagreb 1943
 Colour and Harmony (Boja i sklad), Zagreb 1943
 Unfied Forms (Oblici umieća), I. knj. (SD, III), Zagreb 1944
 The Golden Age of Spanish Painting (Zlatni viek španjolskog slikarstva) (SD, IV), Zagreb 1944
 Honoré Daumier, Zagreb 1951
 French Paintings of the 19th Century (Francusko slikarstvo XIX. stoljeća), Zagreb 1953
 Between Two Worlds (Između dva svijeta), Zagreb 1955
 Izabrana djela (s C. Fiskovićem), Zagreb 1985

Exhibitions
Babić exhibited from 1910 until his death in 1974 in solo, group and collective shows around the world, including the "Medulića" Munich annual exhibition with other artists of the Vienna (Austria) Secession, the Croatian Spring Salon, Lade exhibitions, Independent Artists, Group of Three, Croatian artists, the XXI Venice Biennale, and in a number of other exhibitions of Croatian and Yugoslav artists. At the Exposition internationale in Paris 1925 and in New York in 1926, he worked in the International Theatre Exhibition.

Solo shows
 2010/11 Ljubo Babić – Antologija (Anthology) Modern gallery, Zagreb.
 1975/6 Ljubo Babić Retrospektiva, Modern Gallery, Zagreb

Group shows
Recent exhibitions of Babić's work include:
 2008  From the holdings of the museum - Museum of Modern Art Dubrovnik, Dubrovnik
 2006  Croatian Collection - Museum of Contemporary Art Skopje, Skopje

Public collections
Babić's work can be found in the following public collections

Croatia
 Modern Gallery, Zagreb
 Museum of Contemporary Art, Zagreb
 Museum of Modern Art, Dubrovnik
 Gallery of Fine Arts, Split
 Art Museum, Osijek
 Fine Art Gallery, Rijeka

Macedonia (F.Y.R.M.)
 Museum of Contemporary Art Skopje

References

Further reading
 Miroslav Krleža, Slikar Ljubo Babić, Vjesnik, Zagreb, 21 (1960)
 Matko Peić, Predgovor (u katalogu retrospektivne izložbe Ljubo Babić), Zagreb 1960
 Igor Zidić, Ljubo Babić. Sentimentalni portret, Hrvatski tjednik, Zagreb, 1 (1971), 1, str. 18
 Igor Zidić, Slikari čistog oka – neke težnje u hrvatskom slikarstvu četvrtog desetljeća (u katalogu izložbe Četvrta decenija – Ekspresionizam boje / Poetski realizam), MSU, Beograd 1971, str. 37-51
 Zdenko Tonković, Kazališni scenograf Ljubo Babić, Prolog, Zagreb, 6 (1974), 21, str. 75-92
 Zlatko Posavac, Teorija umjetnosti slikara Ljube Babića. Prikaz i pokušaj interpretacije, Forum, Zagreb, 14 (1975), 29, str. 83-101
 Jelena Uskoković, Prikaz djela Ljube Babića (u katalogu slikareve retrospektive), MG, Zagreb 1975, str.V.-XIX
 Vladimir Maleković, Grupa trojice, Aspekti hrvatske likovne umjetnosti 1930-1935 (u katalogu izložbe), UP, Zagreb 1976, str. 5-27
 Radovan Ivančević, Ljubo Babić. S puta po Španjolskoj / Notes from a Journey through Spain, GZH & NSB, Zagreb 1990
 José Luis Morales y Marin, Tres maestros de la Pintura Croata (Catálogo de la esposición »Grupo de los tres«, Madrid 1994/1995, o. 21-24
 Tonko Maroević, La etapa Espańola de la Obra de Ljubo Babić, ibid., p. 53-56
 Igor Zidić, Ljubo Babić u svjetlu nekih političkih kontroverzija (u katalogu izložbe), TDR, Rovinj 2003, str. 3-12
 Josip Bratulić, Matica hrvatska i hrvatska književnost: kultura knjige u 19. i 20. stoljeću (u: I. Mažuran – J. Bratulić, Spomenica MH 1842.-2002.), Zagreb 2004., str. 128-131, 134-140, 147, 158-161, 163-164, 174
 Petar Selem, Kretanja Ljube Babića (u: Arielov pogled; pretisak iz 1974.), Zagreb 2004., str. 7-20

External links

	

1890 births
1974 deaths
Croatian designers
Croatian art historians
Croatian art critics
Croatian curators
Croatian educational theorists
Yugoslav painters
Yugoslav historians
Yugoslav art critics
Members of the Croatian Academy of Sciences and Arts
People from Jastrebarsko
Vladimir Nazor Award winners
Academy of Fine Arts, Munich alumni
Burials at Mirogoj Cemetery
20th-century Croatian painters
Croatian male painters
20th-century Croatian male artists